The SouthSide Film Festival is an annual non-competitive, not-for-profit film festival that takes place each June in Bethlehem, Pennsylvania. The first festival took place in 2004.

The "SouthSide" refers to the area of the city on the south side of the Lehigh River which was home to Bethlehem Steel and is currently undergoing redevelopment.

The festival's logo pays homage to that industrial heritage by including a representation of a blast furnace, still highly visible in Bethlehem.  Film screenings take place on the campus of Lehigh University and in alternative venues such as Godfrey Daniels Listening Club and Deja Brew Coffeehouse.

From its inception through 2008, the festival has screened films from 54 countries and 31 states of the U.S. The festival focuses on independent filmmaking and features Invitational Films and Juried Selections, a highlighted genre, and a highlighted cultural region. Also included in the annual festival are filmmaking workshops to teach techniques and concepts to accomplished and aspiring filmmakers. Returning teachers include Mel Halbach and Clayton Farr of FilmTreks, Shanti Thakur of Hofstra University, and Pawel Partyka of Se-ma-for animation studio.

The SouthSide Film Festival and its host organization, The SouthSide Film Institute, have received numerous grants and awards including a Bethlehem Fine Arts Commission Organization of the Year award  which noted "By providing access to independent films for the public, creating a venue for film enthusiasts and filmmakers to come together, and mounting a children's film series, (the SouthSide Film Festival is) developing an appreciation for film as an art form and contributing to a thriving arts scene in Bethlehem that benefits the Lehigh Valley"

With 2020 being cancelled caused by the COVID-19 pandemic, the 17th was deferred to 2021.

References

External links 

Film festivals in Pennsylvania
Lehigh University
Tourist attractions in Lehigh County, Pennsylvania
Annual events in Pennsylvania
Film festivals established in 2004
2008 establishments in Pennsylvania